The House of Commons Standing Committee on Natural Resources (RNNR) is a standing committee of the House of Commons of Canada.

Mandate
The management, operation, budget and legislation of the Department of Natural Resources and its affiliated agencies:
The Canadian Nuclear Safety Commission
Atomic Energy of Canada Limited 
The National Energy Board
The current and future state of oil and gas pipelines and refining capacity in Canada
Resource development in Northern Canada
The state of the forestry sector in Canada

Membership

Subcommittees
Subcommittee on Agenda and Procedure (SRNN)

References
Standing Committee on Natural Resources (RNNR)

Natural Resources